Ishmael (Ishmail) Spicer (1760–1832) was a publisher in Baltimore, a teacher, and one of the first American composers.

Ishmael Spicer was born in Bozrah, Connecticut. He founded the first singing school at the Court House in Baltimore in November 1789, basing the curriculum using a teaching system advocated by Andrew Adgate. Tuition was set at $2.50 per quarter and the school was successful for multiple years.

For a time the singing school was attended by John Cole.

Publications

Spicer's Pocket Companion: or the young Mason's monitor, 1799 (printed by Andrew Wright in Northampton).

References

1760 births
1832 deaths
American male composers
18th-century American composers
19th-century American composers
Musicians from Baltimore
People from Bozrah, Connecticut
Musicians from Connecticut
19th-century American male musicians